The Romanian-language Familia literary magazine was first published by Iosif Vulcan in Budapest from 5 June 1865 to 17 April 1880. The magazine moved to Oradea (Nagyvárad) and continued publication from 27 April 1880 to 31 December 1906.

Several new series of the magazine were subsequently published:
 Serie II, 1926–1928
 Serie III 1934 - 1943
 Serie IV  1944 - 1945
 Serie V   1965 - 2020
 Serie VI 2021 - present

References

External links

 Revista Familia Official Web Site
Revista Familia Archive 1865- 1906 on Iosif Vulcan comerative web site

Defunct literary magazines published in Europe
Defunct magazines published in Romania
Literary magazines published in Romania
Magazines established in 1865
Magazines disestablished in 1906
Magazines published in Budapest
Mass media in Oradea
Romanian-language magazines